Steve, Steven or Stephen Schwartz may refer to:

Stephen, American musician; born Stephen Michael Swartz
Stephen Schwartz (pathologist) (1942–2020), American pathologist
Stephen Schwartz (composer) (born 1948), American musical theater and film lyricist and composer
Stephen Schwartz (diplomat) (born 1958), American diplomat
Stephen E. Schwartz (born 1941), American atmospheric scientist at Brookhaven National Laboratory
Stephen S. Schwartz (born 1983), judge of the United States Court of Federal Claims
Stephen Suleyman Schwartz (born 1948), American journalist, political author, and historian
Steven Schwartz (psychologist) (born 1946), American and Australian psychologist
Steven Jay Schwartz (born 1951), professor of Space Physics at Imperial College London

See also
Stefan Schwartz, English actor
Steven O'Mahoney-Schwartz, American Magic: The Gathering player